Deep South is the sixth studio album by American country music artist Josh Turner. It was released on March 10, 2017, through MCA Nashville. The album's lead single, "Lay Low", was released to radio on September 15, 2014, and reached number 25 on the Country Airplay chart. The second single, "Hometown Girl", was released to radio on May 31, 2016. The single peaked at No. 2 on Billboards Country Airplay Chart and No. 1 on Mediabase, making it Turner's fifth No. 1 single. The third single, "All About You" was released to radio on May 15, 2017. It is Turner's first release since 2012's Punching Bag.

Critical reception
AllMusic reviewer Stephen Thomas Erlewine wrote that "Turner doesn't attempt to chase trends, choosing instead to lean into his knack for supple balladry and then build a mature modern country around that sound."

Sounds Like Nashville gave the album a positive review, writing: "With his sixth studio album, Josh Turner delivers a project that should serve as the perfect soundtrack for those perfect spring days".

Commercial performance
The album debuted at No. 18 on the Billboard 200, and No. 1 on the Hot Country Albums chart, with 18,000 copies in pure sales and 21,000 units when tracks and streams are included. The album has sold 61,700 copies in the US as of December 2017.

Track listing

Personnel
Credits adapted from AllMusic
Dave Cohen – synthesizer
Perry Coleman – background vocals 
J.T. Corenflos – electric guitar
Chad Cromwell – drums
Eric Darken – percussion
Horace Dudoit – ukulele and background vocals on "Hawaiian Girl"
Shannon Forrest – drums
Kevin "Swine" Grantt – bass guitar
Kenny Greenberg – electric guitar
Tania Hancheroff – background vocals
Aubrey Haynie – fiddle, mandolin
Wes Hightower – background vocals
Steve Hinson – pedal steel guitar
David Huff – programming
Chris Kamaka – background vocals on "Hawaiian Girl"
David LaBruyere – bass guitar
Gordon Mote – Hammond B-3 organ, keyboards, piano, synthesizer
Russ Pahl – acoustic slide guitar, mandolin, pedal steel guitar
Danny Rader – banjo, acoustic guitar, resonator guitar
Frank Rogers – electric guitar
Glen Smith – background vocals on "Hawaiian Girl"
Bryan Sutton – acoustic guitar 
Russell Terrell – background vocals
Ilya Toshinsky – acoustic guitar
Josh Turner – lead vocals

Charts

Album

Weekly charts

Year-end charts

References

2017 albums
Albums produced by Frank Rogers (record producer)
Josh Turner albums
MCA Records albums
Albums produced by Kenny Greenberg